Hans Willem Blom (born 25 April 1947, Zandvoort) is a Professor of Social and Political Philosophy at Erasmus University. Previously he lectured at the University of Wisconsin–Madison and Cambridge University.  He edits Grotiana, a journal devoted to studies on the Dutch thinker Hugo Grotius.

Published work

References

External links
 Hans Blom website at Erasmus University

1947 births
Living people
20th-century Dutch philosophers
21st-century Dutch philosophers
People from Zandvoort
Utrecht University alumni
Academic staff of Erasmus University Rotterdam